Surya Roshni Limited (formerly Prakash Surya Roshni Limited) is an Indian multinational company headquartered in Delhi that produces fans, steel, lighting, LED, kitchen appliances  and PVC pipes. Surya exports its products over 44 countries and is one of the top manufacturers of LED lights in India.

History
Surya Roshni Limited was established by B.D. Agarwal in 1973 as a tube making unit. Today it also manufactures LEDs, Lighting, PVC Fans. The company's current chairman is the Padma Shri awardee Jai Prakash Agarwal.

Manufacturing plants
Surya Roshni's steel division is called Surya Steel Pipes with steel manufacturing plants in Bhuj (Gujarat), Gwalior (Madhya Pradesh) and its primary steel plant in Bahadurgarh, Haryana. It also has a pipes and lighting production facility at Shimoga, Karnataka. It started commercial production on 1 March 2017 at their new steel pipe plant with an investment of 70 crore at Hindupur industrial area, Andhra Pradesh. Surya's lighting plant is in Kashipur, Uttarakhand and Gwalior (Madhya Pradesh). Additionally, the company has set up a R&D centre for LED lights in Uttarakhand.

References

Manufacturing companies based in Delhi
Steel companies of India
1973 establishments in Delhi
Indian companies established in 1973
Companies listed on the National Stock Exchange of India
Companies listed on the Bombay Stock Exchange